Paige Segal (born May 14, 1987, in Los Angeles, California) is an American actress.

Biography
A former child actress, Segal has acted in episodes of Malcolm in the Middle, George Lopez, among other sitcoms, as well as starring in the indie films The Day the Music Died as Peggy Sue and Operation Splitsville as Louise.

References

External links
 

Actresses from Los Angeles
People from California
American television actresses
American film actresses
1987 births
Living people
21st-century American women